Zygaspis is a genus of amphisbaenians in the family Amphisbaenidae. Species in the genus are commonly known as purple round-headed worm lizards, and are native to equatorial and southern Africa.

Species
The genus contains eight species:
Zygaspis dolichomenta 
Zygaspis ferox  
Zygaspis kafuensis  
Zygaspis maraisi 
Zygaspis nigra  
Zygaspis quadrifrons  – Kalahari round-snouted worm lizard, Kalahari dwarf worm lizard
Zygaspis vandami  – Van Dam's dwarf worm lizard
Zygaspis violacea  

Nota bene: A binomial authority in parentheses indicates that the species was originally described in a genus other than Zygaspis.

References

Further reading
Branch, Bill (2004). Field Guide to Snakes and other Reptiles of Southern Africa. Third Revised edition, Second impression. Sanibel Island, Florida: Ralph Curtis Books. 399 pp. . (Zygaspis, genus, p. 122; species accounts, pp. 122–124).
Cope ED (1885). "Twelfth Contribution to the Herpetology of Tropical America". Proc. American Philosophical Soc. Philadelphia 22: 167-194. (Zygaspis, new genus, p. 188).

 
Lizards of Africa
Lizard genera
Taxa named by Edward Drinker Cope